Universal Religion Chapter 7 is the seventh and the last compilation the Universal Religion compilation series mixed and compiled by Dutch DJ and record producer Armin van Buuren (Updating it' s format in the 2017 for each set of Armin van Buuren in Hï Ibiza). It was released on 13 September 2013 by Armada Music.

Track listing

References

External links
 at Armada Music

Armin van Buuren compilation albums
Electronic compilation albums
2013 compilation albums